Sculpture Journal is a triannual peer-reviewed academic journal of sculpture published by Liverpool University Press. It was established in 1997 by the Public Monuments and Sculpture Association, with Marjorie Trusted as founding editor. The current editors-in-chief are Elisa Foster, Teresa Kittler, Eckart Marchand and Emma Payne.

Abstracting and indexing
The journal is abstracted and indexed in the Arts and Humanities Citation Index, Current Contents/Arts & Humanities, EBSCO databases, ProQuest databases, and Scopus.

References

External links

Triannual journals
English-language journals
University of Liverpool
Arts journals
Publications established in 1997